The Lord-Lieutenant of Argyll and Bute is the British monarch's personal representative for the Scottish council area of Argyll and Bute; the position was established in 1975, replacing the Lord Lieutenant of Argyllshire and the Lord Lieutenant of Buteshire in 1975.

The following have served as Lord-Lieutenant:

 Charles Hector Fitzroy Maclean of Duart, Baron Maclean 1975–1990
 John Crichton-Stuart, 6th Marquess of Bute 1990–1993
 Ian Campbell, 12th Duke of Argyll 1994–2001
 vacant
 Kenneth MacKinnon 2002–2011
 Patrick Loudon McIain Stewart  2011–25 July 2020
 Mrs Jane Margaret MacLeod 14 July 2020–

References

Soureces

Argyll and Bute
Argyll and Bute